Hekuran Kryeziu (born 12 February 1993) is a professional footballer who plays as a midfielder for Swiss club Winterthur. Born in Switzerland, he represents Kosovo at international level.

Club career

Zürich
On 31 May 2018, Kryeziu signed a three-year contract with Swiss Super League club Zürich and this transfer would become legally effective in July 2018. On 22 July 2018, he made his debut in a 2–1 home win against Thun after being named in the starting line-up.

Winterthur
Kryeziu had a trial at Swiss Super League club Winterthur in July 2022, and signed a two-year contract with the club for an undisclosed fee the following month. On 13 August 2022, he made his debut with second team in a 0–0 home draw against Gossau after being named in the starting line-up, while his first team debut came fifteen days later in a 1–5 home defeat against Young Boys after coming on as a substitute at 46th minute in place of Eris Abedini.

International career
From 2010, until 2013, Kryeziu has been part of Switzerland at youth international level, respectively has been part of the U17, U18, U19, U20 and U21 teams and he with these teams played 31 matches. On 10 November 2015, he received a call-up from Kosovo for a friendly match against Albania, and made his debut after coming on as a substitute at 46th minute in place of Eroll Zejnullahu.

Personal life
Kryeziu was born in Luzern, Switzerland from Kosovo Albanian parents from Gjilan.

Career statistics

Club

International

References

External links

1993 births
Living people
Sportspeople from Lucerne
Kosovan footballers
Kosovo international footballers
Kosovan expatriate footballers
Expatriate footballers in Liechtenstein
Kosovan expatriate sportspeople in Liechtenstein
Swiss men's footballers
Switzerland youth international footballers
Switzerland under-21 international footballers
Swiss people of Kosovan descent
Swiss people of Albanian descent
Association football midfielders
Swiss Super League players
FC Luzern players
FC Zürich players
FC Vaduz players
Swiss expatriate footballers
Swiss expatriate sportspeople in Liechtenstein
FC Winterthur players